Adolf Ludvig Stierneld (September 1, 1755 – July 31, 1835) was a Swedish baron, politician, courtier and collector of historical documents. Recent historical research has revealed him to be one of Sweden's best and most prolific document forgers. He was born in Stockholm and died in Gripsholm.

Life
Stierneld was the son of baron Samuel Gustaf Stierneld and Kristina Brigitta Falker. He was inscribed by his father in to the military at birth and became ryttmästare at Livregementet in Stockholm in 1781. From 1778, he served as courtier to the queen, Sophia Magdalena.

Stierneld appeared among the opposition to Gustav III of Sweden in the Riksdag of 1786 and 1789, where he was one of the leaders of the nobility. During the Riksdag of 1789, he belonged to the members of the noble opposition against the absolutist reform of the Union and Security Act, and consequently belonged to the opposition arrested by the monarch during the Riksdag. When the others arrested were released, however, he was detained because of his connections to the Russian ambassador, and placed in Varberg Fortress. In 1790, he was released to marry his fiancée Charlotte Gyldenstolpe, a courtier of the royal duchess Charlotte and a daughter of the king's favorite Nils Philip Gyldenstolpe: the connections of his spouse secured his rehabilitation, and he was appointed court chamberlain in 1792.

Through his position as governor of Gripsholm Castle, Stierneld started the collection of portraits at the castle which was eventually to become the 
National Portrait Gallery (Sweden); he started and organized the collection after the death of Gustav III in 1792, and the collection became officially inaugurated in 1822. He became an honorary member of the Royal Swedish Academy of Letters, History and Antiquities in 1821. In his capacity as director of the museum collection, however, he reportedly misidentified several portraits.

During his later life, Stierneld was also a collector of historical documents. In 1821, he became one of the founders of the Kungliga Samfundet för utgivande av handskrifter rörande Skandinaviens historia (Royal Publication Society of Documents of the History of Scandinavia), in which he served as chairperson several times and also published several essays. In this capacity, he forged, misquoted, manipulated and wrongly interpenetrated numerous historical documents to trace the genealogy of his own family to royalty and give his ancestors a more prominent place in history. One of his inventions is the fictitious person Brita Persdotter Karth.

References

 Svenskt biografiskt handlexikon, band II (Stockholm 1906) (Obs! utgivet före det att Stiernelds ställning som förfalskare uppdagats!)
 Ingemar Carlsson: På lögnens väg – historiska bedrägerier och dokumentförfalskningar (Lund 1999)
 Anna Grosskopf: "Mystiken vilar över porträttet" i Sydsvenska Dagbladet 1996-01-07
 Bengt Hildebrand: Släktartikeln "Eldstierna" i Svenskt biografiskt lexikon, band XIII (Stockholm 1950)
 Matrikel över ledamöter av Kungl. Vitterhetsakademien och Kungl. Vitterhets Historie och Antikvitets akademien, Bengt Hildebrand (1753–1953), Margit 
Engström och Åke Lilliestam (1954–1990), Stockholm 1992  s. 29
 Adolf Ludvig Stierneld, Svenskt Biografiskt Lexikon. Adolf Ludvig Stierneld, urn:sbl:20161, Svenskt biografiskt lexikon (art av Per Widén med bidr av  Lars-Olof Skoglund (Gustaf Algernon S)), hämtad 2012-12-21.
 Paul Sjögren: "Erland Hjärne om Adolf Ludvig Stierneld som historieförfalskare" i Nordisk tidskrift för bok- och biblioteksväsen (1980)

1755 births
1835 deaths
Collectors
Swedish politicians
Swedish nobility
Forgers
Swedish courtiers
18th-century Swedish military personnel
Knights of the Order of Charles XIII